Line 5 (Lilac) is one of the six lines that make up the São Paulo Metro and one of the 13 lines that make up the Metropolitan Rail Transportation Network. The line transports about 600,000 people every business day, and since August 2018 it is operated by the private company ViaMobilidade.

The southern section of the line, between Largo Treze and Capão Redondo was completed in 2002 and was envisioned as a railway line of the CPTM called Line G. The project was transferred to the São Paulo Metro and renamed to Line 5 - Lilac. A northern extension connecting it with the rest of the São Paulo Metro network started construction 2009 with a completion deadline of 2013. The project stalled due to issues with property acquisition and restarted in 2011. The completion deadline of the extension has been delayed several times, but it has been reached on 8 April 2019.

Stations

Operational
There are currently 17 operational stations on the Capão Redondo ↔ Chácara Klabin stretch:

Extensions from Chácara Klabin station to Ipiranga and from Capão Redondo to Jardim Ângela are planned.

Technical specifications
The line operates with 25 trains (out of 26 available) and is made-up by 17 stations, transporting about 600,000 people every business day. Eight additional trains are expected to be added to the line in 2020, after CBTC installation and other enhancements are completed.

It was the first line in the Sao Paulo Metro to utilize a 1500 V tension Catenary, Standard Gauge, beside trains with IGBT power conversion and 1,60 m wide doors. Santo Amaro station was the first in Brazil to be built on a cable-stayed bridge.

During the  extension between Largo Treze and Chacara Klabin stations, three TBMs were used and 26 CAF trains were added to the line in addition to the eight Alstom trains originally available.

Gallery

References

Line 05
Sao 05
Standard gauge railways in Brazil
Railway lines opened in 2002